Nadupadugai is a village in the Papanasam taluk of Thanjavur district, Tamil Nadu, India.200 years generation lives in this place.....one of the nice nature and beautiful forest place in this panjayat.

Demographics 

As per the 2001 census, Nadupadugai had a total population of 225 with 104 males and 121 females. The sex ratio was 1163. The literacy rate was 51.52.

References 

 

Villages in Thanjavur district